Joseph D. Cannon was an American union organizer and politician from New York.

Life
Cannon was an organizer for the Metal Workers' Union in New York.

He ran on the ticket of the Socialist Party of America for U.S. Senator from New York in 1916;  for the Board of Aldermen from the 22nd Ward in 1919; for Governor of New York in 1920; for the New York State Senate (18th District) in 1922; and for the U.S. House of Representatives from New York's 19th congressional district in 1926.

During the party split of 1919, Cannon was a supporter of the Regular faction of National Executive Secretary Adolph Germer and NEC members James Oneal and Morris Hillquit.

References

American trade unionists
American Marxists
Politicians from New York City
Socialist Party of America politicians from New York (state)